Tomáš Sivok (born 15 September 1983) is a Czech former professional footballer who played as a centre-back or midfielder. He made 64 appearances for the Czech national team scoring 5 goals.

Club career
In September 2005, Sivok became a captain of Sparta Prague.

In the middle of 2006, Sivok became a main face of a Czech government anti-racist campaign which is called Together Against The Racism.

He signed for Udinese during the January 2007 transfer window. In May 2008, he was sold by Udinese to the Turkish side Beşiktaş for €4.7 million. He signed a four-plus-one-year contract worth €800,000 per season and up to €100,000 in bonuses; his salary would have risen to €1.2 million if he had extended his contract to 2013.

Sivok joined Czech First League club Dynamo České Budějovice in 2019.

International career
Sivok was captain of the Czech Republic U21 national team in 2006. He made his debut for the Czech national team on 3 September 2005.

Personal life
Sivok married Michaela Šachlová on 9 March 2009 in Istanbul. Their first child is a son named Andre Tomas.

Career statistics

Club

International
Scores and results list Czech Republic's goal tally first, score column indicates score after each Sivok goal.

Honours
Sparta Prague
Czech First League: 2002–03, 2004–05
Czech Cup: 2004–05, 2005–06, 2007–08

Beşiktaş
Süper Lig: 2008–09
Turkish Cup: 2008–09, 2010–11

References

External links

  
 
 
 Tomáš Sivok at AC Sparta Prague 

1983 births
Living people
People from Pelhřimov
Sportspeople from the Vysočina Region
Czech footballers
Association football central defenders
Association football midfielders
Czech Republic international footballers
Czech Republic under-21 international footballers
Czech Republic youth international footballers
Czech First League players
Serie A players
Süper Lig players
Israeli Premier League players
AC Sparta Prague players
SK Dynamo České Budějovice players
Udinese Calcio players
Beşiktaş J.K. footballers
Bursaspor footballers
Maccabi Petah Tikva F.C. players
UEFA Euro 2008 players
UEFA Euro 2012 players
UEFA Euro 2016 players
Czech expatriate footballers
Expatriate footballers in Italy
Czech expatriate sportspeople in Italy
Expatriate footballers in Turkey
Czech expatriate sportspeople in Turkey
Expatriate footballers in Israel
Czech expatriate sportspeople in Israel